Saybag District is one of 7 urban districts of the prefecture-level city of Ürümqi, the capital of Xinjiang Uygur Autonomous Region, Northwest China. According to the 2002 census, it has a population of 440,000.

Transport
Ürümqi railway station
Ürümqi South railway station

County-level divisions of Xinjiang
Ürümqi